A Lost Leader is a 1922 British silent drama film directed by George Ridgwell and starring Robert English, Dorothy Fane, and George Bellamy. It is based on the 1906 novel of the same title by E. Phillips Oppenheim.

Cast
 Robert English as Lawrence Mannering
 Dorothy Fane as Duchess Berenice
 Lily Iris as Blanche Fillimore
 Lionel d'Aragon as Sir Leslie Borrowden
 George Bellamy as John Fardell
 Teddy Arundell as Henry Rochester
 Cecil Ward as Lord Redford

References

Bibliography
 Goble, Alan. The Complete Index to Literary Sources in Film. Walter de Gruyter, 1999.
 Low, Rachael. The History of British Film (Volume 3): The History of the British Film 1914 - 1918. Routledge, 2013.

External links

1922 films
1922 drama films
British silent feature films
British drama films
Films directed by George Ridgwell
Stoll Pictures films
Films based on British novels
Films set in London
Films shot at Cricklewood Studios
1920s English-language films
1920s British films
Silent drama films